The Tune of Li Zhongtang is the first semi-official national song of China, written by Li Hongzhang in 1896 during the Qing Dynasty. It also served as the imperial anthem for the dynasty.

History
In 1896, (the 22nd year of Guangxu), Li Hongzhang (李鴻章), Minister of Beiyang and Governor of Zhili, paid a diplomatic visit to west Europe and Russia. As a national song was requested for the welcome ceremony, Li Hongzhang adapted a Tang Dynasty poem by Wang Jian for the purpose.

Lyrics

Simplified Chinese
金殿当头紫阁重，
仙人掌上玉芙蓉，
太平天子朝天日，
五色云车驾六龙。

Traditional Chinese
金殿當頭紫閣重，
仙人掌上玉芙蓉，
太平天子朝天日，
五色雲車駕六龍。

Hanyu Pinyin
Jīndiàn dāng tóu zǐgè chóng, 
Xiānrén zhǎng shàng yù fúróng, 
Taìpíng Tiānzǐ cháo tiān rì, 
Wǔ sè yúnchē jià liù lóng.

English Translation
In the Golden Palace, amongst the overlapping purple pavilions,
Like a jade lotus flower in an immortal's palm,
The Son of Heaven of Supreme Peace pays tribute to Heaven's sun,
In its five-colour chariot of clouds, drawn by six dragons.

See also 
Royal anthem
Historical Chinese anthems
Anthem of the Beiyang Fleet: Shares the same tune with Tune of Li Zhongtang.

Songs about politicians
Political party songs
Royal anthems
Historical national anthems
National symbols of China
Chinese patriotic songs
Asian anthems
1896 songs
Cultural depictions of Chinese men
Cultural depictions of politicians